is a Japanese football player who currently plays for J-Lease FC from 2023.

Club career
Hattanda begin first youth career with University of Tsukuba in 2008. When he was in Kagoshima Chuo High School, he participated in the FIFA U-17 World Cup as a member of the U-17 Japan national team. He was selected as a representative of the Universiade in his fourth year at the University of Tsukuba and won the championship. He was graduation at university in 2011.

On 4 December 2011, Hattanda begin first professional career with Shimizu S-Pulse from 2012.

On 8 January 2014, Hattanda was loaned out to Vegalta Sendai. However, he only made three league appearances.

On 17 January 2015, He returned to Shimizu. Enter the starting lineup from the opening game of the league. He made fewer appearances in the second half, but made a career-high 15 league appearances.

In 2016, Shimizu was relegated to J2, making it his first time playing in J2, but by July he had only played in one match. On 7 July of the same year, he loan transfer to J3 club, Oita Trinita. He made his first appearance on July 16th in the 17th round against Fujieda MYFC and has appeared in all 14 games until the final round. He contributed to J3 victory.

On 27 December 2016, Nagoya Grampus announced the permanent signing of Hattanda.

On 27 December 2018, Hattanda joined Kagoshima United for the 2019 season. On 24 November 2022, Kagoshima confirmed it would not be extending his contract, with Hattanda leaving the club after four years at Kagoshima.

On 25 December of the same year, Hattanda was officially announced as a new signing of J-Lease FC for the upcoming 2023 season.

National team career
In August 2007, Hattanda was elected to the Japan U-17 national team for the 2007 U-17 World Cup. He played one match against Haiti in first match.

Career statistics
.

Club

References

External links

Profile at Nagoya Grampus
Profile at Oita Trinita

1990 births
Living people
University of Tsukuba alumni
Association football people from Kagoshima Prefecture
Japanese footballers
Japan youth international footballers
J1 League players
J2 League players
J3 League players
Shimizu S-Pulse players
Vegalta Sendai players
Oita Trinita players
Nagoya Grampus players
Kagoshima United FC players
Association football midfielders
Universiade gold medalists for Japan
Universiade medalists in football
Medalists at the 2011 Summer Universiade
People from Kagoshima